Richard Plunz is an American architect, critic, and historian. He is Professor of Architecture at the Graduate School of Architecture, Planning and Preservation at Columbia University in the City of New York and the Founder and Director of the Urban Design Lab, a research unit of Columbia's Earth Institute, where he also serves as professor.

Education and career 
Plunz studied architecture at Rensselaer Polytechnic Institute in Troy, New York, where he earned B.S. in engineering, B.Arch, and M.Arch degrees. There, and at Pennsylvania State University, he researched urban history and development and began developing field techniques related to the anthropology of building and people's relationship to the built environment.

He has been at Columbia since 1973, and served as Chair of the Division of Architecture and Director of the post-professional Urban Design Program from 1992 to 2015. Plunz has also held visiting professor positions at the Catholic University of Leuven, in Flanders, and Polytechnic University of Turin, in Italy.

Research and publications 
Plunz has pursued research related to housing, urban history, anthropology, urban parametrics, and design. During the 1970s, he undertook anthropological field research in a series of major studies using digitized environmental modeling to help understand the divergent urban contexts of Mantua, in West Philadelphia, the frazione of San Leucio in Southern Italy, and in the Adirondack High Peaks region in New York State.

Other significant work includes a 40-year study in Turgutreis, Turkey, which documented the transformation of small villages into a modern city through the experiences of 15 families, and a Millennium Cities Initiative-developed strategic analysis of Accra, Ghana's Ga Mashie and Nima neighborhoods.

His A History of Housing in New York City tracks the city's housing developments from 1850 and was published in 1992, and republished in 2016 with new research and an introduction by urban historian Kenneth T. Jackson. Urban planner Peter Marcuse wrote of the book in a 1992 review, “For its wealth of information and description, for its humane perspective, and for the illumination it provides on the role of architecture in the shaping of housing in New York City over the decades, this is a most valuable book.”

Awards 
Plunz received the Andrew J Thomas Award from the American Institute of Architects for his pioneering work in housing.

Bibliography 
 City Riffs. Urbanism, Ecology, Place. Zurich: Lars Müller, 2017. 
 A History of Housing in New York City. Tokyo: Kajima, 2005; New York: Columbia University Press, 1990, 2016. 
 Turgutreis 1974. (co-author with Suha Özkan). Istanbul: Literatür, 2016. 
 Urban Climate Change Crossroads (editor with Maria Paola Sutto). New York: UDL, 2008; Surrey: Ashgate, 2010.  
 Eco-Gowanus: Urban Remediation by Design (editor with Patricia Culligan). Columbia MSAUD New Urbanisms 8. 2007.
 The Urban Life World. Formation Perception Representation (editor with Peter Madsen). London: Routledge, 2002. 
 Two Adirondack Hamlets in History. Keene and Keene Valley (editor). Fleishmanns, New York: Purple Mountain Press, 1999. 
 Habiter New York. La Forme Institutionalisée de l'Habitat New Yorkais, 1850-1950. Liège, Belgium: Pierre Mardaga Editeur, 1982. 
 Design and the Public Good. Selected Writings, 1930-1980 by Serge Chermayeff (editor). Cambridge, Massachusetts: The MIT Press, 1982. 
 Housing Form and Public Policy in the United States (editor). New York: Praeger Publishers, 1980. 
 San Leucio. Vitalità d'Una Tradizione. Traditions in Transition. New York: George Wittenborn and Company, 1973. 
 Mantua Primer. Toward a Program for Environmental Change. Baltimore: United States Public Health Service, November, 1970.

References

External links 
 Columbia GSAPP faculty profile
 Earth Institute profile
 Design Trust profile

Architectural theoreticians
Columbia University faculty
Living people
Year of birth missing (living people)
Columbia Graduate School of Architecture, Planning and Preservation faculty